Bhogaraju Pattabhi Sitaramayya (24 November 1880 – 17 December 1959) was an Indian independence activist and political leader in the state of Andhra Pradesh. He was also the first governor (1 November 1956 – 13 June 1957) of Madhya Pradesh.
Books Written By Him -
1. National Education 
2. INDIAN NATIONALISM 
3. Economic Conquest of India 
4. Gandhi,Gandhism and Socialism

Early life and education
Born in Gundugolanu village, Krishna district (now part of Eluru district) in Andhra Pradesh to a Telugu Niyogi Brahmin family, Pattabhi graduated from the Madras Christian College, fulfilled his ambition to become a medical practitioner by securing a M.B.C.M. degree.

Career

Medical and early political career
He started his practice as a doctor in the coastal town of Machilipatnam, headquarters of Krishna District and the political centre of Andhra. He left his lucrative practice to join the freedom fighting movement. During the years 1912–13, when there was a great controversy over the desirability of forming a separate province for Andhra, he wrote a number of articles in "The Hindu" and other journals explaining the need for immediate formation of linguistic provinces.

At the Lucknow session of the Congress in 1916, he demanded the formation of separate Congress circle for Andhra. The demand was opposed by Mahatma Gandhi, but as Tilak supported Pattabhi, the Andhra Congress Committee came into existence in 1918. He was a member of the Working Committee of the Congress for a number of years and the President of Andhra Provincial Congress Committee in 1937–40.

Publications and imprisonment
He ran for the presidency of the Indian National Congress as the candidate closest to Mohandas Gandhi, against Netaji Subash Chandra Bose in Tripuri Session of 1939. He lost owing to Netaji's rising popularity and the belief that Pattabhi favoured the inclusion of Tamil-majority districts in a future Telugu state in independent India.

Serving on the Congress Working Committee when the Quit India Movement was launched in 1942, Pattabhi was arrested with the entire committee and incarcerated for three years without outside contact in the fort in Ahmednagar, Maharashtra. During this time he maintained a detailed diary of day-to-day life during imprisonment, which was published later as Feathers and Stones. He is also the author of The History of the Congress published in 1935 with an introductory note given by the Rajendra Prasad. His other popular publication was Gandhi and Gandhism .

High office
He ran successfully for Congress presidency in 1948, winning with the support of Jawaharlal Nehru, the Prime Minister of India. He was a member of the J.V.P. Committee (Jawaharlal Nehru, Vallabhbhai Patel and Pattabhi) which formally rejected the reorganization of states on linguistic lines but after a 56-day hunger strike by Potti Sriramulu the formation of Andhra State without Madras City took place. Prior to this he served as a member in the Constituent Assembly, in 1952 he was elected to Rajya Sabha. Pattabhi also served as the Governor of Madhya Pradesh from 1956 to 1957.

Andhra Bank
With the financial support of Srimantu Raja Yarlagadda Sivarama Prasad Bahadur, Bhogaraju Pattabhi Sitaramayya established Andhra Bank in Machilipatnam on 28 November 1923 which is currently one of the major commercial banks of India. Its present headquarters is located at Hyderabad. The head office of Andhra Bank, "Pattabhi Bhavan", is named after him. He also started Andhra Insurance Company, Krishna Jilla Co-Operative Bank in Krishna District Bhagyalakshmi Bank. As announced by Govt of India on 29 August 2019, Andhra Bank is being merged with Union Bank of India and Corporation Bank on 1 April 2020 and thus losing its exclusive identity.

References

External links
Pattabhi's biography
FreeIndia.org – B. Pattabhi Sitaramayya's biography
Congress Sandesh – Pattabhi Sitaramayya's biography

Presidents of the Indian National Congress
Indian independence activists from Andhra Pradesh
Governors of Madhya Pradesh
Telugu politicians
1880 births
1959 deaths
People from Krishna district
Members of the Constituent Assembly of India
Indian National Congress politicians from Andhra Pradesh
Prisoners and detainees of British India
Andhra movement